Julián Luque Conde (born 27 March 1992) is a Spanish footballer who plays for Cultural y Deportiva Leonesa mainly as a winger.

Club career
Born in Torrelavega, Cantabria, Luque was a product of local giants Racing de Santander's youth system. He made his senior debut at only 17, appearing in 20 games with the reserves (one goal) in an eventual relegation from Segunda División B.

On 22 January 2011, Luque made his first-team – and La Liga – debut, playing 20 minutes in a 0–3 away loss against eventual champions FC Barcelona. On 15 May, as the team was already safe from relegation, he received his first start, featuring the full 90 minutes in another away fixture, a 2–1 defeat to Sporting de Gijón.

On 2 September 2013, after another relegation with Racing, Luque signed with Danish Superliga club SønderjyskE Fodbold, going on to become the first Spaniard to score in that competition. He returned to his country in the following transfer window, joining RCD Espanyol's reserve team.

Luque continued to compete in the Spanish third level in the following seasons, with CD Guijuelo and Cultural y Deportiva Leonesa.

International career
In early 2009, Luque began being called for the Spain under-17 side.

Career statistics

Club

References

External links

1992 births
Living people
People from Torrelavega
Spanish footballers
Footballers from Cantabria
Association football wingers
La Liga players
Segunda División players
Segunda División B players
Tercera División players
Rayo Cantabria players
Racing de Santander players
RCD Espanyol B footballers
RCD Espanyol footballers
CD Guijuelo footballers
Cultural Leonesa footballers
Danish Superliga players
SønderjyskE Fodbold players
Spain youth international footballers
Spanish expatriate footballers
Expatriate men's footballers in Denmark
Spanish expatriate sportspeople in Denmark